The 1893 Lafayette football team was an American football team that represented Lafayette College as an independent during the 1893 college football season. In its first year under head coaches Pearl T. Haskell and H. H. Vincent, the team compiled a 3–6 record. Ernest Edwards was the team captain. The team played its home games on The Quad in Easton, Pennsylvania.

Schedule

References

Lafayette
Lafayette Leopards football seasons
Lafayette football